The Alberta Enterprise Group (AEG) is a member-based, non-profit business advocacy organization based in Edmonton, Alberta, Canada.

The organization claims its members collectively employ more than 150,000 people and generate billions in economic activity each year.

The organization states its mission as applying the collective experience of its members in order to solve public policy challenges and to form and promote public policy solutions and to provide forums for the exchange of ideas and best practices.

History
In 2006 a group of Alberta business leaders came together to form a fundraising/political action group called Grassroots Leadership Group. The group unsuccessfully supported Mark Norris on the first ballot in his Progressive Conservative Association of Alberta leadership bid. After Norris dropped off the ballot, the group supported eventual winner Ed Stelmach on the second ballot.

After the PC leadership process, Grassroots Leadership Group members decided to keep the group together as a business advocacy organization and re-branded as Alberta Enterprise Group, headed by then-Chairman Cal Nichols.

In the early days the organization was led by Tim Shipton until his departure to Join the Oilers Entertainment Group (OEG).  Tim Shipton was previously director of the Progressive Conservative Association of Alberta.

In February, 2019 the organization announced the appointment of John Liston as President. In June, 2019 Danielle Smith was the President.

Activities
The organization has conducted several meetings over the years trying to draw more business to Canada.  In 2008 AEG brought 100 of the province's business leaders to Washington D.C. to meet with congressional leaders and United States business leaders. Then in 2009 the organization brought more than 60 of the province's business leaders to Geneva, Switzerland in an effort to showcase Alberta to the European investment community. In both 2008 and 2009 the organization brought more than 150 businessmen and politicians from across North America to tour the oil sands mining operations. Participants  visited Syncrude, Albian and CNRL's Horizon Mine.

In the spring of 2010, AEG organized the Alberta Connects outreach mission to Ottawa.  Alberta Connects introduced AEG members to Prime Minister Stephen Harper, Finance Minister Flaherty, Environment Minister Prentice, Liberal Leader Michael Ignatieff and 55 other Members of Parliament and Senators.

In 2011, the group returned to Washington, D.C. to engage U.S political leaders in a discussion on improving trade relations between Canada and the United States and ensuring market access for Canadian energy. In 2012, the group brought a delegation of 40 business leaders to Quebec to meet with business and political leaders in that province, purportedly to improve trade ties between the two provinces.

In 2015, the group organized a trade mission to British Columbia where it met with British Columbia Energy and Mines Minister Bill Bennett, First Nations Energy & Mining Council CEO Dave Porter, and Iain Black, CEO of the Vancouver Board of Trade and others. A mission highlight was a keynote address by MEG Energy CEO Bill McCaffrey.

In 2018 the group organized a trade mission to Nevada. Meeting Governor Sandoval, visiting the largest industrial park in the world, The /Tahoe-Reno Industrial Complex, with tenants such as Telsa, Switch, etc.

The organization is a strong proponent of what it calls "sustainable resource development," arguing that impediments to resource development imposed by excessive regulation hurt the Canadian economy and government revenues.

The group has also been engaged in the discussion on Alberta's provincial budget, advocating spending restraint as opposed to tax increases to address a growing government deficit.

Business taxation advocacy
In April 2015, during the 2015 Alberta general election campaign the group released a study arguing that increasing business taxes would kill jobs and investment, increase consumer prices and reduce wages for workers.

Labour Reform
The organization has also published information regarding collective bargaining. In December 2009 AEG released a study calling for reforms to provincial labour laws, hoping to create good business climates while upholding the collective bargaining rights of workers. The paper argued that the Canada's labour laws lag behind Europe, Australia and the United Kingdom.  Some of the recommendations in the study included: having membership cards instead of signing petitions; requiring a quorum, and allowing unionized workers in Alberta be allowed opt out of the portion of their union dues that is spent on lobbying and political activities. The organization supported enacting a Worker Free Choice Act (WFCA) to which would allow workers the right to choose whether or not to join or financially support a union as a condition of employment. Bob Barnetson, who is an associate professor of labour relations at Athabasca University, spoke out against the study's conclusions and how it was conducted.  However, the study was endorsed by the Merit Contractors Association, Canadian Constitution Foundation and the Canadian Federation of Independent Business. A survey conducted by AEG also found that 65 percent believed 70 percent of employees should vote to certify or decertify a union.  The poll also found that 78 percent agreed that union dues should only be spent on collective bargaining and union management instead of policy influence.

Oil sands
Im May 2011 AEG went to Washington, D.C. to talk about borders security, energy development and trade. Participants met with Members of the U.S. House of Representatives and Senate to discuss the pending decision on the Keystone XL pipeline.  The meetings noted that tar sands knowledge had increased, discussed Canada's commitment to its environment and the benefits of the oil sands to America.  In December 2011, AEG led a counter-boycott of Chiquita Bananas in response to the company signing on to an anti-oil sands campaign coordinated by California-based environmental advocacy group Forest Ethics. Chiquita later said that it would continue to use Canadian oil. Levi-Strauss and Timberland were also targeted by AEG in the boycott of the boycotters, but were later taken down from the page after the companies said they would not boycott Canadian oil.

References

External links
 Alberta Enterprise Group
 Alberta Enterprise Group, Twitter
 Alberta Enterprise Group, Facebook

Government watchdog groups in Canada
Taxpayer groups
Business organizations based in Canada
Conservatism in Canada
Non-profit organizations based in Alberta
Politics of Alberta
2006 establishments in Alberta
Lobbying organizations in Canada